Sphingomonas dokdonensis  is a Gram-negative and rod-shaped bacteria from the genus of Sphingomonas which has been isolated from soil from the Dokdo Island in Korea.

References

Further reading

External links
Type strain of Sphingomonas dokdonensis at BacDive -  the Bacterial Diversity Metadatabase

dokdonensis
Bacteria described in 2006